Mysuru Airport , also known as Mandakalli Airport, is a domestic airport serving Mysore, a city in the Indian state of Karnataka. As of January 2023, the airport has regular daily flights to Chennai, Hyderabad and Goa.

The airport's history dates to the 1940s, when it was constructed by the Kingdom of Mysore. Passenger service, training flights of the Indian Air Force, and other operations took place at Mysore Airport during its first several decades.

History
Following Indian independence in 1947, the Government of Karnataka assumed control of the airfield. The Ministry of Civil Aviation took control in 1950. Passenger service to Bangalore using Dakota aircraft began, but it did not last long as people found travel by road to be faster. Thereafter, The Hindu started daily flights from Chennai via Bangalore to deliver its newspapers. However, these flights lasted only a few months.

Afterward, the airfield was used by charter flights carrying foreign tourists and by flights transporting dignitaries to the city, such as Jawaharlal Nehru. The Indian Air Force operated training flights at the airport as well. In 1985, regional airline Vayudoot commenced thrice weekly flights from Bangalore using its Dornier 228 aircraft. The service was inaugurated by famous Indian writer R. K. Narayan. At the time, Mysore Airport consisted solely of a grass airstrip and a one-roomed terminal with one toilet. Because of low passenger loads, the flights ended in 1990.

The existing terminal was built in 2010, allowing the airport to handle 200 passengers. Airlines started commencing flights, however due to poor response, the flights were stopped leaving the airport unused. With central government's UDAN scheme, flights started functioning again, and as of December 2020, there are flights to 7 destinations from Mysore Airport.

Infrastructure
Mysore Airport has a single runway, 09/27, with dimensions  and the ability to service ATR 72 turboprop and similar aircraft. The apron has three parking stands and is connected to the runway by a single perpendicular taxiway. Mysore Airport's passenger terminal occupies  and can hold a maximum of 200 passengers. Volvo buses from Mysuru City Bus Stand are available 7 times a day before flight timings.

Airlines and destinations

Future plans

The runway cannot be extended to the west because of the presence of a railway line, while an extension to the east requires diverting National Highway 766. The State Government initially decided to hold off on this phase, preferring to wait until air traffic increased and the cost of diverting the highway was justified.

Proposal for second phase was submitted by the State government of Karnataka for extension of runway. It proposed tunneling NH 766 beneath the runway, which requires less land than deviating the highway; but the Central Government rejected this proposal, citing security concerns. In August 2016, however, the Deccan Chronicle reported that the Ministry of Civil Aviation had directed airport officials to have a study conducted regarding tunneling of the highway.

On 17 May 2018, central government gave permission to the above proposal and as per the plan the existing runway would be expanded to 2750 metres. In 2020, it was announced that government has agreed to upgrade Mysore Airport to an International Airport after runway expansion.

See also
 List of airports in Karnataka

References

External links
 
 Images of the inaugural Kingfisher Airlines flight
 Mysore Airport at the Airports Authority of India

Airports established in 1940
Mysore
Transport in Mysore
Buildings and structures in Mysore
Mysore South
1940 establishments in India
20th-century architecture in India